Per Knutsen (4 August 1951 – 19 August 2022) was a Norwegian novelist, author of children's literature, crime writer and playwright. He made his literary debut in 1976 with the children's book Gutten og ørna. He received the Norwegian Critics Prize for Best children's book in 1982 for Gull og sølv. Knutsen died on 19 August 2022, at the age of 71.

References

1951 births
2022 deaths
20th-century Norwegian novelists
21st-century Norwegian novelists
Norwegian children's writers
Norwegian Critics Prize for Literature winners
Norwegian dramatists and playwrights
People from Hamarøy